Tŷ Croes railway station serves Tŷ Croes on the isle of Anglesey, Wales which is served by Transport for Wales Rail and is a request stop.

History
The station, originally to be named Llanfaelog, was opened in November 1848 with a signal box being added in 1872. The box is located next to a level crossing which separates the two staggered platforms. There was a warehouse and a crane nearby and a small goods yard which closed in 1964. The crossing gates are still hand worked by the crossing keeper – the Grade II listed box was formerly a block post, but no longer works as such (the block section now runs from Gaerwen to ).

Facilities
The station is unmanned and has no ticketing provision – all tickets must be bought in advance or on the train. The station buildings still stand and are now used as a private residence; basic waiting shelters are provided for passenger use on each side. Digital display screens, timetable posters and a telephone provide train running information. Step-free access is available to both platforms via ramps from the road that crosses the line here, though the gradient on both makes the station unsuitable for wheelchair users.

Services

There is a two-hourly weekday service in each direction from the station.

The Sunday service is irregular (six westbound, seven eastbound) and runs mainly to/from Crewe with one service to Wrexham and Cardiff.

References

Further reading

External links

Railway stations in Anglesey
DfT Category F2 stations
Former London and North Western Railway stations
Railway stations in Great Britain opened in 1848
Railway stations served by Transport for Wales Rail
Railway request stops in Great Britain
Aberffraw